is a former Japanese football player. She played for the Japanese women's national football team.

Club career
Nishina played for Iga FC Kunoichi and was selected Best Eleven in 1998.

National team career
On 5 May 1995, Nishina debuted for Japan national team against Canada. She also played at 1995, 1997 AFC Championship and 1998 Asian Games. She was also a member of Japan for 1995, 1999 World Cup and 1996 Summer Olympics. She played 46 games and scored 2 goals for Japan until 2000.

National team statistics

References

External links
 

1972 births
Living people
Place of birth missing (living people)
Japanese women's footballers
Japan women's international footballers
Nadeshiko League players
Iga FC Kunoichi players
1995 FIFA Women's World Cup players
Olympic footballers of Japan
Footballers at the 1996 Summer Olympics
Asian Games medalists in football
Footballers at the 1998 Asian Games
Women's association football defenders
Asian Games bronze medalists for Japan
Medalists at the 1998 Asian Games
1999 FIFA Women's World Cup players